Åsa Windahl  (born 27 November 1972) is a Swedish snowboarder.

She was born in Västerås Municipality. She competed at the 2002 Winter Olympics, in parallel giant slalom.

References

External links 
 

1972 births
Living people
People from  Västerås Municipality
Swedish female snowboarders
Olympic snowboarders of Sweden
Snowboarders at the 2002 Winter Olympics
Sportspeople from Västmanland County
21st-century Swedish women